Iterative Receiver Design is a 2007 engineering book by Henk Wymeersch published  by Cambridge University Press. The book provides a framework for developing iterative algorithms for digital receivers, exploiting the power of factor graphs.

Chapters 
 Introduction
 Digital communication
 Estimation theory and Monte Carlo techniques
 Factor graphs and the Sum-Product algorithm
 Statistical inference using factor graphs
 State-space models
 Factor graphs in digital communication
 Decoding
 Demapping
 Equalization: general formulation
 Equalization: single-user single-antenna communication
 Equalization: multi-antenna communication
 Equalization: multi-user communication
 Synchronization and channel estimation
 Appendices

References 

2007 non-fiction books
Electrical engineering books
Cambridge University Press books